The Twenty-First Canadian Ministry was the cabinet chaired by Prime Minister Joe Clark.  It governed Canada from 4 June 1979 to 3 March 1980, including all of the 31st Canadian Parliament.  The government was formed by the Progressive Conservative Party of Canada.

Ministers

References

Succession

21
Ministries of Elizabeth II
1979 establishments in Canada
1980 disestablishments in Canada
Cabinets established in 1979
Cabinets disestablished in 1980